George Maxwell Wise (born June 28, 1975) is an American politician and former FBI agent, serving as a member of the Kentucky Senate from the 16th district. He assumed office in the Kentucky Senate on January 1, 2015. Former U.S. Ambassador to the United Nations Kelly Craft chose Wise to be her running mate in the 2023 Kentucky gubernatorial election.

Early life and education 
Wise was born in Campbellsville, Kentucky. He attended Campbellsville High School, graduating in 1993. 

He earned a Bachelor of Arts degree in Political Science and History from Campbellsville University in 1997. He then earned a Master of Arts degree in International Politics and National Security from the University of Kentucky in 1999, and a graduate certificate in homeland security from Texas A&M University.

Career

FBI and academia
Prior to entering politics, when 9/11 took place Wise joined the Federal Bureau of Investigation, and served as an agent in the FBI Counterterrorism Division. He was first assigned to FBI headquarters in Washington, D.C. before being relocated to the Louisville, Kentucky field office. He was a member of the Louisville Joint Terrorism Task Force and the Kentucky Intelligence Fusion Center. Wise then taught political science at Campbellsville University, and graduate-level terrorism courses at the University of Kentucky.

Politics
Wise was first elected to the Kentucky Senate (16th district) in November 2014, along the way defeating Republican incumbent Sara Beth Gregory in the Republican primary 54%-46%. Wise was then unchallenged in the 2014 Kentucky Senate general election, and assumed office on January 1, 2015. During the 2017 legislative session, he served as chair of the Senate Enrollment Committee and vice chair of the Senate Education Committee. Wise won the 2018 Kentucky Senate general election, with 96.7% of the vote. Since 2019, he has served as the Senate Education Committee chair. In 2021-22, in addition to continuing to chair the Senate Education Committee, Wise was on the Senate Agriculture Committee, the Senate Health and Welfare Committee, and the Senate Transportation Committee.  Wise then won the 2022 Kentucky Senate general election, with 100.0% of the vote.

In September 2022, former U.S. Ambassador to the United Nations Kelly Craft chose Wise to be her running mate in the 2023 Kentucky gubernatorial election.

Personal life
Wise's father is George Wise, and his mother Donna Wise was the women’s basketball coach at Campbellsville University. She is Campbellsville University’s all-time winningest coach, and was inducted into the NAIA Basketball Hall of Fame in 2000, and the Kentucky Athletic Hall of Fame in 2010.

Wise is married to Heather Hood Wise. She had been a high school basketball star at Glasgow High School and started her college career at Georgetown College, and Wise met her when he helped his mother recruit her to play for CU. She is now a pediatric dentist. They have four children; Grayson, Jackson, Carter, and McLean.

References 

1975 births
Living people
American political scientists
Campbellsville University alumni
Campbellsville University faculty
Federal Bureau of Investigation agents
People from Campbellsville, Kentucky
Republican Party Kentucky state senators
Texas A&M University alumni
University of Kentucky alumni
University of Kentucky faculty